Plew and Plews are surnames. Notable people with the names include:

Plew 
 James E. Plew (1862–1938), American businessman
 Mildred Plew Meigs (née Plew, 1892–1944), American poet

Plews 
 Herb Plews (1928–2014), American baseball player
 Nigel Plews (1934–2008), English cricket umpire

See also
 Plew, Missouri, an unincorporated community in Lawrence County